Anwar Hossain Chowdhury is a retired brigadier general of the Bangladesh Army, politician of the Bangladesh Nationalist Party and former Member of Parliament for Barisal-6 constituency.

Early life 
Chowdhury was born in Barisal District.

Career 
Chowdhury is a retired Brigadier General of the Bangladesh Army. He was elected as a Member of Parliament from Barisal-6 constituency as a candidate of Bangladesh Nationalist Party in the Sixth Parliamentary Election on 15 February 1996.

References 

Bangladesh Army generals
Bangladesh Nationalist Party politicians
Year of birth missing (living people)
Living people
People from Barisal District